Ceylon competed in the Summer Olympic Games for the first time at the 1948 Summer Olympics in London, England.

Medalists

Athletics

 John De Saram
 G. D. Peiris
 Duncan White

Boxing

 Eddie Gray
 Leslie Handunge
 Alex Obeysekera
 Albert Perera

References
Official Olympic Reports
Sri Lanka at the 1948 London Summer Games
International Olympic Committee results database

Nations at the 1948 Summer Olympics
1948
1948 in Ceylon